Orthildaites is a genus of ammonites that lived during the lower Toarcian stage of early Jurassic, during Falciferum subzone.

Description 
Shell of these ammonites had quadrate whorl section with broad venter and strong keel in the center. Almost straight ribs were curving slightly forward at ventrolateral edge. Coiling has been evolute. It has evolved form genus Hildaites and gave rise to Hildoceras from which it differs in morphology by broader whorls and straight ribs.

Remarks 
Orthildaites fossils were found in Europe and north Africa.  Only one (or two) species is known in the Toarcian NW European domain, its diversity is higher in the Mediterranean faunal province.

Validity of O. orthus is debated, as sometimes it is considered to be valid, while other authors consider it to be a synonym of O. douvillei.

References

Ammonitida genera
Hildoceratidae
Toarcian life
Early Jurassic ammonites of Europe
Ammonites of Africa
Ammonite genera